En la Plaza de Toros México (English In Mexico's Plaza de Toros) is the 14th album by Mexican pop singer, Ana Gabriel, and her second live. It was released on 1998. This is a compilation of self-penned previous rancheras and pop material. Gabriel also pays tribute to the quintessential ranchera composer José Alfredo Jiménez and Juan Gabriel. This new release was presented in a package of two cds and it was edited again in 2007 with a DVD format.

Track listing
 CD and DVD has the same order in the tracks.

Album charts

1998 charts

2007 charts

Sales and certifications

References

Ana Gabriel live albums
1998 live albums
2007 live albums
2007 video albums
Live video albums
Spanish-language live albums
Spanish-language video albums
Sony International live albums
Sony International video albums
Ana Gabriel video albums